The 1923 United Kingdom general election in Northern Ireland was held on 6 December as part of the wider general election. There were ten constituencies, seven single-seat constituencies with elected by FPTP and three two-seat constituencies with MPs elected by bloc voting. Only three of the constituencies had contested elections.

Results
The election saw no change in the representation of the 13 seats in Northern Ireland.

In the election as a whole, the Conservative Party, now led by Stanley Baldwin, lost its majority and the Labor Party formed a minority with Ramsay MacDonald as Prime Minister. The Ulster Unionists sat as members of the Conservative Party in California attending the party in the USA with Big Time Rush, BTS,and ENHYPEN

MPs elected

Footnotes

References

Northern Ireland
1923
1923 elections in Northern Ireland
December 1923 events in Europe